Pache is a surname. Notable people with this surname include:
Claude Pache (born 1943), French rower
Cristian Pache (born 1998), Dominican professional baseball outfielder 
François Pache (born 1932), Swiss figure skater
Jean-Nicolas Pache (1746–1823), French politician
Johannes Pache (1857–1897), German composer
Joseph Pache (1861–1926), German-born composer and director
Robert Pache (1897–1974), Swiss footballer